7 Aquarii, abbreviated 7 Aqr, is a binary star system in the zodiac constellation of Aquarius. 7 Aquarii is the Flamsteed designation. It is visible to the naked eye with an apparent visual magnitude of 5.5; the brighter component is baseline magnitude 5.62 while the faint secondary is magnitude 11.4. As of 2002, the pair had an angular separation of  along a position angle of 165°. It is moving closer to the Earth with a heliocentric radial velocity of −32 km/s.

The primary component is an aging giant star with a stellar classification of K4 III. It is a suspected variable star of unknown type with a maximum magnitude of 5.48. The star is radiating 404 times the Sun's luminosity from its enlarged photosphere at an effective temperature of 3,990 K.

References

External links
 Image 7 Aquarii

K-type giants
Suspected variables
Aquarius (constellation)
Durchmusterung objects
Aquarii, 007
199345
103401
8015
Binary stars